State Highway 391 (SH 391) is a  long north–south state highway in the vicinity of Denver, Colorado.

Route description
The southern terminus of the route is at U.S. Route 285 (US 285) in Lakewood. The northern terminus is at Interstate 70 (I-70) exit 267 in Wheat Ridge. The road is known as Kipling Parkway from US 285 north to West Mississippi Avenue and Kipling Street from Mississippi to I-70.

History 
The route was established in 1955, when it began at Colfax Avenue and headed south to Alameda Avenue. The northern terminus was extended to 44th Avenue by 1967 and to I-70 by 1968. SH 391 was extended south to US 285 in 1985.

Major intersections

References

External links

391
Transportation in Jefferson County, Colorado
Transportation in Lakewood, Colorado
Wheat Ridge, Colorado